Tarcisio Vincenzo Benedetti (28 October 1899 - 24 May 1972) was the Italian Bishop of the Roman Catholic Diocese of Lodi from his appointment by Pope Pius XII on 11 November 1952 until his death on 24 May 1972.

Benedetti was ordained a Catholic priest on 17 July 1927. He was appointed Auxiliary Bishop of Sabina-Poggio Mirteto on 10 June 1949 and was ordained titular Bishop of Ierichus on 3 July 1949.

He was appointed bishop of Lodi on 10 July 1952.

Bishop Tarcisio Vincenzo Benedetti died on 24 May 1972, at the age of 72.

Resources
Profile of Mons. Benedetti www.catholic-hierarchy.org
Official page of diocese of Lodi

1899 births
Bishops of Lodi
20th-century Italian Roman Catholic bishops
1972 deaths
Clergy from the Province of Bergamo